Vadym Dmytrovych Hranchar (born 7 March 1998) is a Ukrainian professional footballer who plays as an attacking midfielder for Ukrainian club Real Pharma Odesa.

References

External links
 
 
 

1998 births
Living people
Ukrainian footballers
Ukraine youth international footballers
Association football midfielders
FC Chornomorets Odesa players
FC Oleksandriya players
FC Balkany Zorya players
FC Real Pharma Odesa players
Ukrainian Premier League players
Ukrainian First League players
Ukrainian Second League players